The Ramsey Youth Centre and Old Boys F.C., or "The Youthie" is a football club based in Ramsey, Isle of Man. They currently play in The Premier Division after being promoted in the 2020/2021 season. Their local rivals are Ramsey A.F.C. and Ayre United A.F.C., the other northern clubs. The Youthie is also one of the oldest Manx football clubs.

They play next to the Scoill Ree Gorree school on Lezayre Road. They play in a blue and black home strip with a green goalkeeper top, with a red and black away strip with a yellow goalkeeper top.

As of season 2022/2023 the First Team are coached by Keith Lythgoe with Youthie legend Ray Leech in charge of the combination team.

After a successive promotion and relegation the club are now back in JCK Division 2. The first team are a mixture of youth and experience with Martyn Murphy, Dylan Parish, Tony Corlett and Andy Black amongst the old heads and the youthful talent includes Corey Cassidy, Sean Crawley and Ross Crawford. The combination team is very young but are having a great season so far and currently lead the Combination 2 League.

Teams
Alongside the two senior teams, the club has a junior set-up with a range of teams for all young ages, including an under-6s, under 8's, under-10s, under-12s and Under 16s. The club also contests in the Cowell Cup tournament (16–21).

Facilities
The team use the special built changing rooms for the club in the Scoill Ree Gorree school. The seniors train on a Monday in the Scoill Ree Gorree sports hall and on a Thursday at the RGS Astro. The juniors train on a Saturday morning at the pitch 9.30-11/11;30 dependent on age.

Honours
Division Two
Runners-up 2012–13
Division Two
Runners-up 2014–15
Woods Cup Runners-up 2014-15

References

Football clubs in the Isle of Man
Association football clubs established in 1945
1945 establishments in the Isle of Man
Ramsey, Isle of Man